Moreton Corbet and Lee Brockhurst is a civil parish in Shropshire, England.

It is the result of a merger of two older parishes - Moreton Corbet and Lee Brockhurst in 1988.

See also
Listed buildings in Moreton Corbet and Lee Brockhurst

References 

Civil parishes in Shropshire